Walmor de Souza Chagas (28 August 1930 – 18 January 2013) was a Brazilian actor, director, and producer. He appeared in more than 50 films and television shows between 1965 and 2012. Chagas died on 18 January 2013, in his home in Guaratinguetá, São Paulo. In 1956 he was awarded with Prêmio Saci.

He was found with a bullet wound in the head. It is believed that he committed suicide.

Filmography

References

External links

1930 births
2013 deaths
2013 suicides
People from Porto Alegre
Brazilian male film actors
Suicides by firearm in Brazil
20th-century Brazilian male actors
21st-century Brazilian male actors